The 1994 Maryland gubernatorial election was held on November 8, 1994. Incumbent Democratic Governor William Donald Schaefer was ineligible for re-election. Prince George's County Executive Parris Glendening emerged victorious from the Democratic primary after defeating several candidates. Former State Delegate Ellen Sauerbrey, who would also be the 1998 Republican nominee for Governor, won her party's nomination. The election between Glendening and Sauerbrey was extremely contentious; the Sauerbrey campaign challenged the results. Ultimately, Glendening prevailed over Sauerbrey. This election marked the first time since the 1915 gubernatorial election that a Democrat won Maryland without Baltimore County, the first time since the 1930 gubernatorial election that a Democrat won Maryland without Cecil County, and the first time since the 1919 gubernatorial election that a Democrat won without St. Mary’s County.

Democratic primary

Candidates
Don Allensworth, college professor, investor and planning consultant
Mary Boergers, State Senator
Walter Gilcrist Finch, attorney
Lawrence K. Freeman, Lyndon LaRouche activist and perennial candidate
Parris N. Glendening, Prince George's County Executive
American Joe Miedusiewski, State Senator	
Melvin A. Steinberg, Lieutenant Governor

Republican primary

Candidates
Helen Delich Bentley, U.S Representative
Ellen Sauerbrey, former State Delegate
 William S. Shepard, diplomat

General election

Results

References 

Gubernatorial
Maryland
1994